Eric Isaacs is an American physicist who is the 11th President of the Carnegie Institution for Science where he oversees the research and business functions across six research departments on the East and West coasts and observatories in Chile. 

Isaacs spent many years at the University of Chicago from which he departed in July 2018 as the Robert A. Millikan Distinguished Service Professor in physics and the James Franck Institute Executive Vice President for Research, Innovation and National Laboratories. From 2014 to 2016, was Provost of the university. Prior to that he was director of Argonne National Laboratories for five years, where he had been since 2003, with a joint appointment in the university’s physics department.

Previously, he worked for 15 years at Bell Labs, including serving as director of the Semiconductor Physics Research and Materials Physics Research Departments. At Bell Labs, Isaacs developed synchrotron-based X-ray-scattering techniques, including inelastic X-ray scattering and X-ray microscopy that continue to play an important role in materials and nanoscale scientific research.

Isaacs’ research interests are in condensed matter physics and quantum materials. He earned his bachelor of science degree from Beloit College in 1979 and a Ph.D. in physics from MIT in 1988. He has published more than 150 scholarly articles.

References

External links

 Biography of Eric Isaacs at Argonne National Laboratory 
 Office of the Executive Vice President for Research, Innovation and National Laboratories

21st-century American physicists
Argonne National Laboratory people
University of Chicago faculty
MIT Department of Physics alumni
Living people
Year of birth missing (living people)
Beloit College alumni